Cuba competed at the 1992 Summer Paralympics in Barcelona and Madrid, Spain. The country's delegation consisted of 10 competitors in athletics, javelin, swimming, and triple jump. All 10 competitors were men and finished the Paralympics tied with Portugal ranked 29th.

Medalists

See also
Cuba at the 1992 Summer Olympics

References

 

Nations at the 1992 Summer Paralympics
1992
Paralympics
Disability in Cuba